Thuwaini bin Said al-Busaidi (1821–1866) also called  (19 October 1856 – 11 February 1866), was the third son of Said bin Sultan, Sultan of Muscat and Oman. Thuwaini was born in Oman, and never visited Zanzibar. When his father was away in Zanzibar, Thuwaini was his representative in Oman.

Thuwaini was married to his cousin Ralie (Sayyida Ghaliya bint Salim Al-Busaidiyah), daughter of his father's elder brother Salim Ibn Sultan. They had several children.

After the death of Said bin Sultan on Zanzibar in 1856, Thuwaini became Sultan of Muscat and Oman, while his brother, the sixth son, Majid, took power on Zanzibar. Through British mediation, it was agreed that Majid should pay a yearly tribute to Oman. However, Majid paid this tribute a few years only, and when he stopped, Thuwaini was in no position to enforce payment from the much wealthier Zanzibar. This left Muscat and Oman in a difficult financial situation. Thuwaini was forced to levy duties on various articles, creating malcontent. In 1866 he was rumored to have been killed by his own son, Sayyid Salim bin Thuwaini.

The Arabist scholar and traveller William Gifford Palgrave relates how, when they were shipwrecked in March 1863 on Sowadah Island just off Oman, they were very well received and treated by Thuwaini.

References

Emily Ruete, Ulrich Haarmann (Editor), E. Van Donzel (Editor), Leiden, Netherlands, (1992): An Arabian Princess Between Two Worlds: Memoirs, Letters Home, Sequels to the Memoirs, Syrian Customs and Usages. 
Palgrave, W. G. (1866): Personal Narrative of a Year's Journey through Central and Eastern Arabia (1862–1863), Vol. II, (full text available online, also reprinted many times)

1821 births
1866 deaths
19th-century Arabs
19th-century Omani people
Al Said dynasty
Sons of Omani sultans
Sultans of Oman